Head were an English rock band of the late 1980s.

History
After making three albums and a few singles the Bristol-based combo faded away. Nick Sheppard previously played in The Cortinas and The Clash. Gareth Sager previously played in The Pop Group, and in Rip Rig + Panic with Neneh Cherry.

Although they never achieved major sales they are now belatedly acknowledged as a forerunner of today's trip hop scene.

The title of the second album is a reference to Tales of Ordinary Madness, a film based on the work of poet Charles Bukowski.

Discography
A Snog on the Rocks (1987)
Tales of Ordinary Madness (1988)
Intoxicator (1989)

Members
Rich "Clevedon Pier" Beale - lead vocals
Gareth "Hank Sinclair" Sager - guitar, keyboards, most songwriting
Nick "Chopper Harris", "Candy Horsebreath" Sheppard - guitar
Paul "Cheese Jackson" Francis - bass
John Slight - bass (Virgin Records)
Jamie "Plastic Bag" Hill - drums
Mark "SMT" Taylor - bass

See also
Culture of Bristol
List of bands from Bristol
Bristol Sound

References

English rock music groups
Musical groups from Bristol
Culture in Bristol